Charles Clayton Dennie (1883–1971) was an American dermatologist, notable for Dennie-Marfan syndrome and Dennie-Morgan fold.

Biography 
Charles Clayton Dennie was born in Excelsior Springs, Missouri on October 20, 1883. He was educated at Baker University and the University of Kansas.

He died at Saint Luke's Hospital in Kansas City on January 13, 1971.

References

External links 
 

1883 births
1971 deaths
American dermatologists
Baker University alumni
University of Kansas alumni